Wilbur Thomas Jackson (2 December 1909 – 20 January 2005) was an Australian rules footballer who played with Melbourne in the Victorian Football League (VFL).

Notes

External links 

Webber Jackson on Demonwiki

1909 births
2005 deaths
Australian rules footballers from Victoria (Australia)
Melbourne Football Club players